Leslie George Edwards  (6 August 1916 – 8 February 2001) was a British ballet dancer and ballet master. He was one of the final links with Ninette de Valois's original pre-war Vic-Wells Ballet. Apart from two years of military service during the Second World War, his entire 60-year career was effectively spent with what became the Royal Ballet organisation, until his final retirement from the stage in 1993.

Early years
Edwards was born on 6 August 1916 and trained with Marie Rambert after leaving school at the age of 15. He then joined the Vic-Wells Ballet School. He also trained with Margaret Craske, Stanislav Idzikowski and Vera Volkova. He debuted at Rambert's Ballet Club in 1932.

Performing career
Edwards was a cast member in the original production of Antony Tudor's Jardin aux Lilas in 1936. He first danced with the Vic-Wells Ballet in 1933, however, he only officially joined the company in 1937. With the Vic-Wells Ballet, he was a member of the first cast of Frederick Ashton's Les Patineurs. Edwards was known for his character roles rather than classical technique and later enjoyed purely mime roles. He taught mime at the Royal Ballet School while still a principal with the Royal Ballet. His career began in the supporting male roles before graduating to the villains. His niche, however, was in "the meatier roles in the mime and character repertory" such as the Red King in De Valois's Checkmate and as the American tourist in Massine's La Boutique fantasque. Edwards's success grew, however, after Frederick Ashton created the amiable role of Arthur for him in his A Wedding Bouquet of 1937. Edwards as the Beggar in Robert Helpmann's 1944 ballet Miracle in the Gorbals was deemed irreplaceable and he thus appeared in all 92 performances of the ballet. He was also notable as the farmer Thomas in Ashton's La Fille Mal Gardée of 1960. He had an unusually long 60-year career, which was interrupted only for two years of war service during the Second World War. However, he returned, after being invalided out, to create many more roles and he appeared in dozens of ballets. His most famous role was as Catalabutte in Sleeping Beauty.

Roles created for him
 Arthur in Ashton's A Wedding Bouquet, 1937
 Lawyer in de Valois's The Prospect Before Us, 1940
 Archimago in Ashton's The Quest, 1943
 the Beggar in Helpmann's Miracle in the Gorbals, 1944
 Chauffeur in Ashton's Les Sirènes, 1946
 Bilby in Howard's A Mirror for Witches, 1952
 Hypnotist in MacMillan's Noctambules, 1956
 Oedipus in Cranko's Antigone, 1959
 farmer Thomas in Ashton's La Fille Mal Gardée, 1960
 Basil G. Nevinson in Ashton's Enigma Variations, 1967

Later years
Edwards worked as a rehearsal director for the Royal Ballet from 1959 to 1970. He was the first director of the newly formed Royal Ballet Choreographic Group from 1967 to 1987. Here he assisted many emerging British choreographers, including Ronald Hynd, Geoffrey Cauley, David Bintley and Michael Corder. He also served as ballet master for the Royal Opera from 1970 to 1990.

He was described as "gentle, unassuming, kindly, very distinguished in bearing – a senior civil servant among dancers – yet happily possessed of a wicked but never malicious sense of humour". He died at his home in London on 8 February 2001 after suffering from cancer. His autobiography, In Good Company: Sixty Years with the Royal Ballet, was published posthumously in 2003.

References

Obituaries
 NY Times by Jack Anderson, 12 February 2001
 Dance Magazine Obituary
 Musical Opinion Obituary

Further reading
 Musical Opinion review of In Good Company: Sixty Years With the Royal Ballet
 Ballet Magazine review of In Good Company: Sixty Years With the Royal Ballet

British male ballet dancers
Dancers of The Royal Ballet
1916 births
2001 deaths
Officers of the Order of the British Empire
People from Teddington
20th-century British ballet dancers
English autobiographers